Radha Champakalakshmi (born 1932) is an Indian historian and social scientist who served as Professor in the Centre for Historical Studies, Jawaharlal Nehru University (JNU) and President of the Indian History Congress.

Works

References 
 

1932 births
20th-century Indian historians
21st-century Indian historians
Living people